Seán Rogers (born 1 January 1953) is an Irish Social Democratic and Labour Party  (SDLP) politician who was a Member of the Northern Ireland Assembly (MLA)  for South Down from 2012 to 2016. He replaced former party leader Margaret Ritchie, who had resigned from the Assembly.

References

1953 births
Living people
Social Democratic and Labour Party MLAs
Northern Ireland MLAs 2011–2016
People from County Down